Rudbar Sara (also Romanized as Rūdbār Sarā) is a village in Khara Rud Rural District, in the Central District of Siahkal County, Gilan Province, Iran. At the 2006 census, its population was 68, in 17 families.

References 

Populated places in Siahkal County